Motor Speedway Resort (MSR) Houston is a road course race track located in Angleton, Texas. The track uses a membership system similar to that of country clubs where members may use the course for a nominal fee per use. The track has recently begun hosting its own racing series for club members.

The facility has a separate  banked-turn karting course also with 17 turns, a rally track  in size, and a  skidpad.

The course is also often used for track rentals that may involve professional race teams, particularly those in various sports car series as well as the IndyCar Series and Atlantic Championship.

MSR Houston is the home of the following: Hands On Driving Academy, DESports Racing, WildWing America, Tramontana America, and Spec Racer Sports.

References

External links

MSR Houston official website
Spec Racer Sports
Hands On Driving Academy veterans outreach driving school

Motorsport venues in Texas
Buildings and structures in Brazoria County, Texas